Run BASIC is a web application server, based on the Liberty BASIC version of the BASIC programming language.

Programming model
Run BASIC uses a desktop programming model.  Web pages are not kept in individual files or dealt with as templates but are generated dynamically as determined by the programmer. It can be programmed in two styles. With procedural programming, applications are made using subroutines and functions. Application is state which is managed automatically and transparently. With object-oriented programming, applications can be componentized into objects with methods called on them. Any object can render itself into a web page as a way to have different parts of a web page managed in a modular way.

Run BASIC favors a widget-based approach where the user interface (UI) is programmed without using HyperText Markup Language (HTML).  High-level commands automatically generate HTML.  Colors, fonts, backgrounds and layout can be adjusted using Cascading Style Sheets (CSS). If needed, HTML or JavaScript can be injected into a page. Interactivity is similar to that of desktop applications, with callbacks tying user actions to program routines. Marshaling web requests and dispatching user actions to procedures is automatic.

Run BASIC can draw graphics and render them into web pages; fetch files from other web sites using GET and POST and use a built-in XML parser to extract data; and includes a database capability using the SQLite database engine.

Web server model
Run BASIC is not an add-on module like Perl or PHP is for Apache.  The BASIC compiler and execution model is integrated tightly with its own HTTP server.  If needed, it can be proxied behind another web server, such as Apache. Session management is transparent to programmers. When a web application starts, it is given a session. If it is then inactive long enough (duration is customizable), the session times out and memory is reclaimed.  Session logic need not be put in the code.

Supported platforms, licenses
Supported operating systems include Microsoft Windows 2000, XP, Vista, Mac OS X, and Linux. Supported web browsers include Internet Explorer 6 and 7, Mozilla Firefox 2 and 3, and Safari 3.x. Licenses include commercial and freeware.

See also
Liberty BASIC, the Windows-based BASIC on which Run BASIC is based
SQLite, a popular database engine used by Run BASIC

References

External links
 
 Run BASIC: Online programming at NetworkWorld
 Hosting for Run BASIC applications

BASIC interpreters
Web frameworks
Web server software
BASIC programming language family